Thorleif Asbjørn Kristoffersen (19 August 1900 – 25 August 1971) was a Norwegian sailor who competed in the 1920 Summer Olympics. He was a crew member of the Norwegian boat Sildra, which won the gold medal in the 8 metre class (1919 rating).

References

External links
profile

1900 births
1975 deaths
Norwegian male sailors (sport)
Sailors at the 1920 Summer Olympics – 8 Metre
Olympic sailors of Norway
Olympic gold medalists for Norway
Olympic medalists in sailing
Medalists at the 1920 Summer Olympics